Midgee is a rural locality in the Rockhampton Region, Queensland, Australia.

References 

Suburbs of Rockhampton Region
Localities in Queensland